The 58th Brigade was a formation of British Army. It was part of the new army also known as Kitchener's Army. It was assigned to the 19th (Western) Division and served on the Western Front during the First World War.

Formation
The infantry battalions did not all serve at once, but all were assigned to the brigade during the war.
9th Battalion, Cheshire Regiment
9th Battalion, Royal Welsh Fusiliers
5th Battalion, South Wales Borderers
9th Battalion, Welsh Regiment
6th Battalion, Wiltshire Regiment
2nd Battalion, Wiltshire Regiment 
58th Machine Gun Company
58th Trench Mortar Battery

References

Infantry brigades of the British Army in World War I